Tethyaster is a genus of echinoderms belonging to the family Astropectinidae.

The genus has almost cosmopolitan distribution.

Species:

Tethyaster albertensis 
Tethyaster antares 
Tethyaster aulophora 
Tethyaster canaliculatus 
Tethyaster grandis 
Tethyaster guerangeri 
Tethyaster jurassicus 
Tethyaster pacei 
Tethyaster subinermis 
Tethyaster tangaroae 
Tethyaster vestitus

References

Astropectinidae
Asteroidea genera